The District Council of Orroroo Carrieton is a local government area in the Yorke and Mid North region  of South Australia. The principal towns are Orroroo and Carrieton; it also includes the localities of Belton, Black Rock, Coomooroo, Erskine, Eurelia, Johnburgh, Minburra, Pekina, Walloway, Yalpara and Yanyarrie, and part of Cradock, Hammond, Moockra, Morchard, Tarcowie and Yatina.

It was created in 1997 from the merger of the District Council of Carrieton and the District Council of Orroroo.

Elected Members

References

External links
 District Council of Orroroo Carrieton

Orroroo Carrieton
Mid North (South Australia)